James Bridge may refer to:

James Bridge Copper Works, British copper smelting plant
James River Bridge, a bridge in Virginia, United States carrying U.S. Route 17, U.S. 258, and State Route 32
James River Bridge (Interstate 95), a bridge in Virginia, United States carrying Interstate 95

See also
Darlaston James Bridge railway station (former), West Midlands
James Bridges (disambiguation)